Eassie railway station served the village of Eassie, Angus, Scotland from 1838 to 1956 on the Scottish Midland Junction Railway.

History 
The station opened on 4 June 1838 by the Newtyle, Eassie and Glamiss Railway but disappeared from the timetable. It reopened on 2 August 1848. It closed to both passengers and goods traffic on 11 June 1956.

References

External links 

Disused railway stations in Angus, Scotland
Former Caledonian Railway stations
Railway stations in Great Britain opened in 1838
Railway stations in Great Britain closed in 1956
1848 establishments in Scotland
1956 disestablishments in Scotland